City of God: A Novel of the Borgias is a 1979 historical novel by Cecelia Holland. Set in 15th-century Rome during the Borgia period, it follows Nicholas Dawson, ambitious secretary to the Florentine ambassador, as he becomes embroiled in dangerous political intrigue.

Plot
Nicholas Dawson is the secretary to the ambassador of Florence in Rome; clever and ambitious, he is homosexual and a highly educated commoner born in Spain to English parents. Soon Nicholas is enlisted as a double agent for the ruthless Cesare Borgia, and his contact in Florence is none other than Niccolò Machiavelli himself.

Critical reception
David Maclaine called City of God a "gripping" novel of "slowly mounting tension leading to an intense pay-off. It is a brilliant introduction to the people and events that gave us the word 'Machiavellian.'" According to Library Review, "Holland attributes to Nicholas a keenly analytical mind, a self-serving nature, and a penchant for other men, facets which blend well with her representation of this unsettled time."

References

Further reading
 
 
 

1979 American novels
American LGBT novels
Historical novels
Novels set in Rome
Novels set in the Middle Ages
Novels set in the Renaissance
Novels with gay themes
Cultural depictions of Cesare Borgia
1970s LGBT novels